Iron Cap Lake is a small freshwater lake located in the Alpine Lakes Wilderness, at the south ridge of Azurite Lake and other Necklace Valley lakes in King County, Washington. The lake is nestled on the north skirt of Iron Cap Mountain and produces the West Fork of the Foss River towards Bonnie Lake and contributions from Otter Lake. A short distance towards the West are Crawford Lake and Chetwoot Lake. Self-issued Alpine Lake Wilderness permit required for transit within the Necklace Valley area.

Geography
Iron Cap Lake replicates the geology of the ridges that surround it with Permian volcanic rocks, Jurassic/Crustaceous sedimentary and volcanic rocks, with Tertiary granites and alluvium of recent age. The ridges may have iode gold, lead-zinc and silver known as Iron Cap and Tooker-Leshud deposits.

West Fork Foss River
Iron Cap Lake was formerly a small glacier, snow and ice now feed into the upper West Fork Foss River drainage.

See also 
 List of lakes of the Alpine Lakes Wilderness

References 

Lakes of King County, Washington
Lakes of the Alpine Lakes Wilderness
Okanogan National Forest